The Grand Prix Charles-Léopold Mayer (Charles-Léopold Mayer Prize) is awarded annually by the Académie des Sciences (French Academy of Sciences) de l'Institut de France (the French Institute) to researchers who have performed outstanding work in the biological sciences; especially in the areas of cell or molecular biology. Citizens or residents of any nation are eligible for the prize, but it is never awarded to individuals of the same nation two years in a row, nor is the prize ever presented to scholars who are more than 65 years of age. Between the first presentation of the award in 1961 and the year 2009, there have been more than 60 laureates, eleven of whom subsequently received the Nobel Prize in medicine, physiology, or chemistry.

The prize is named after French biochemist Charles Léopold Mayer.

List of Recipients of the Grand Prix Charles-Léopold Mayer
Source:  Académie des sciences

2019 - Silvia Arber
2018 - Eric Gilson
2016 - Claude Desplan
2015 - François Schweisguth
2014 - C. David Allis
2013 - Vincent Colot
2012 - Lyndon Emsley
2011 - Jean-Marc Reichhart
2010 - Robert Tjian
2009 - Marie-France Carlier
2008 - Adrian P. Bird
2007 - Eric Westhof
2006 - Bruce A. Beutler
2005 - Jean Dénarié
2004 - Denis Duboule
2003 - Paolo Sassone-Corsi
2002 - Roger D. Kornberg
2001 - Joël Bockaert
2000 - H. Robert Horvitz
1999 - Christine Petit
1998 - Elizabeth Blackburn

1997 - Andre Sentenac
1996 - Stanley B. Prusiner
1995 - Moshe Yaniv
1994 - Ralph L. Brinster and Richard Palmiter
1993 - Andrée Tixier-Vidal
1992 - Raymond Devoret and Miroslav Radman
1991 - Jean-Charles Schwartz
1990 - Jozef Schell and Marc Van Montagu
1989 - Marc Chabre
1988 - David Sabatini
1987 - Paul Cohen
1986 - Antonio Garcia-Bellido and Walter Jakob Gehring
1985 - Jean Montreuil
1984 - John Bertrand Gurdon
1983 - Michel Lazdunski and Vittorio Luzzati
1982 - Barbara McClintock and Armine Braun
1981 - François Chapeville and Léon Hirth
1980 - Philippe L'Héritier

1979 - David Mervyn Blow and David Chilton Phillips
1978 - Roger Monier and Piotr Slonimski
1977 - Walter Gilbert, Mark Ptashne, and Evelyn M. Witkin
1976 - Jean-Pierre Ebel and Élie Wollman
1975 - Sydney Brenner
1974 - Georges Cohen
1973 - Jacques Oudin
1972 - Robert W. Briggs and Thomas J. King
1971 - Boris Ephrussi
1970 - Raymond Latarjet
1969 - Jean Brachet
1968 - François Gros
1967 - Marshall Nirenberg
1966 - Marianne Grunberg-Manago
1965 - Honor Bridget Fell
1964 - André Lwoff
1963 - Erwin Chargaff
1962 - François Jacob and Jacques Monod
1961 - Francis Crick

See also

 List of biology awards

External links
Institut de France, Académie des Sciences - Official Site
List of Laureates since 1961 (retrieved March 20, 2011)

Biology awards
Biophysics awards
Awards of the French Academy of Sciences
1961 establishments in France
Awards established in 1961